Hellen Auma Wandera is a Ugandan politician who is the Busia District Women Representative elect in Uganda's  elect 11th Parliament. She serves on the Committee on Presidential Affairs in the eleventh parliament of Uganda.

Background and education 
Hellen Auma Wandera was born in Busia District to Dickson Wandera and Betty Afuro. She went to Busia Parents Primary School for PLE, then to Great Obrem Memorial in Tororo District for her UCE and St. Peters Naalya (Spena International) for her high school (UACE) before joining Kyambogo University for her Bachelor of Arts And Social Science.

Political career 
She is affiliated to the National Resistance Movement (NRM). She defeated Nina Nekesa, Fiona Nakku, Nabwire Sharon Veron Namumayi, Esther Busingye Wafula, Grace Nyakecho, Teddy Auma and Lilian Taaka in the 2020 NRM Parliamentary Primaries. She replaced Jane Nabulindo Kwoba as the Woman Member of Parliament for Busia District in Uganda's 2021 general election.

References

Living people
Year of birth missing (living people)
People from Busia District, Uganda
Kyambogo University alumni
Women members of the Parliament of Uganda
Members of the Parliament of Uganda
21st-century Ugandan politicians
21st-century Ugandan women politicians